The Manor House is located in Kenosha, Wisconsin.

History
The house was built for James E. Wilson, an executive with Nash Motors. It was later used as the residence for headmasters of Kemper Hall. The house was listed on the National Register of Historic Places in 1980 and on the State Register of Historic Places in 1989.

References

Houses on the National Register of Historic Places in Wisconsin
National Register of Historic Places in Kenosha County, Wisconsin
Houses in Kenosha County, Wisconsin
Buildings and structures in Kenosha, Wisconsin
Brick buildings and structures
Houses completed in 1926